Acme is an unincorporated community in Michigan. On the shores of the East Arm of Grand Traverse Bay, Acme is located in Acme Township, a part of Grand Traverse County. It is part of the urban area of Traverse City. Acme is home to the Grand Traverse Resort & Spa.

History 
Acme was established by L S. Hoxie from Saratoga County, New York, who, after arriving here in 1864, purchased land and platted the settlement. Alburtus T. Hoxie, son of L.S., became the first postmaster of Acme in 1869.  The post office had opened as "Whitewater" on July 16, 1857, but was renamed on June 10, 1869. Acme takes its name from a Greek word, acme, meaning "summit".

In 1892, an extension of the Chicago and West Michigan Railway from Traverse City to Petoskey was built through Acme.

Acme's post office closed on February 15, 1933. However, it was reestablished on February 1, 1952.

In 1986, the tallest building in Grand Traverse County, the tower at the Grand Traverse Resort & Spa, opened in Acme.

Geography 
Acme is part of Northern Michigan. It is located in southwestern Acme Township, in northeastern Grand Traverse County. It lies upon the eastern shore of the East Arm of Grand Traverse Bay, a bay of Lake Michigan. The community is located at the mouth of the eponymous Acme Creek.

Major highways 

  runs south–north through the community. To the south, the highway runs through Traverse City, and further down the Lake Michigan coast. To the north, US 31 runs through Elk Rapids towards Charlevoix, Petoskey, and the Mackinac Bridge.
  intersects US 31 in the heart of the community. It follows US 31 south and west to Traverse City, and to the east, runs through Williamsburg toward Kalkaska and Grayling.

Education 
Acme is part of the Traverse City Area Public Schools district. The nearest public high school is Traverse City Central High School. Bertha Vos Elementary School, located within the community, served local elementary students until 2008.

See also 

 Cherry production in Michigan

References

Sources

Unincorporated communities in Michigan
Unincorporated communities in Grand Traverse County, Michigan
Traverse City micropolitan area
Populated places established in 1869
1869 establishments in Michigan
Michigan populated places on Lake Michigan